Octonauts is a children's television series, produced by Silvergate Media for the BBC channel CBeebies, and based on the children's books written by Vicki Wong and Michael C. Murphy.

The show follows an underwater exploring crew made up of stylized anthropomorphic animals, a team of eight adventurers who live in an undersea base, the Octopod, from which they go on undersea adventures with the help of a fleet of aquatic vehicles. Although its technology is fictional, the exotic creatures and locations that the crew encounter are based on real marine animals in their natural habitats. The show's subject matter has been compared to that of Star Trek and Thunderbirds blended with Jacques Cousteau.

The show was animated in Ireland by Brown Bag Films for its first four series. The show was renewed for a fifth series in 2018, with Canada's Mainframe Studios taking over animation work. A Netflix-original spinoff, subtitled Above & Beyond, was released in September 2021, and featured the Octonauts venturing onto more land-based habitats of the natural world.

Characters

Main characters
The Octonauts, consisting of the Octopod crew and captain, are the recurring main characters.

Vegimals
Vegimals are half-animal, half-vegetable creatures. The vegimals were discovered by Shellington as eggs attached to the side of the Octopod. To protect them he brought them into his lab, where they hatched a few days later. After a few weeks, they established themselves as an integral part of the crew. They primarily speak Vegimalese, a language made of chirps and warbles (heavily accented English with inter-mixed gibberish), though they also speak a limited amount of English (with an accent). Shellington is the only (non-vegimal) Octonaut who has some fluency in Vegimalese.

Minor characters

Vehicles

Books
The original books were first published in the US by Immedium in 2006 and were republished in the UK by HarperCollins in 2009. Six titles by Meomi have been published:

 The Octonauts & the Only Lonely Monster, about an Architeuthis (Giant Squid).
 The Octonauts & the Sea of Shade, about a world where everyone's shadows have gone missing.
 The Octonauts & the Frown Fish, about a glum-looking catfish.
 The Octonauts & the Great Ghost Reef, about coral bleaching.
 The Octonauts Explore the Great Big Ocean, about the search for Tunip the Vegimal's home.
 The Octonauts & the Growing Goldfish, about Dunkie, a giant goldfish who won't stop growing.

A series of shorter books based on individual episodes from the TV series is being published by Simon & Schuster.
These titles can be distinguished by the "As seen on TV" label on the covers and are not written or illustrated by Meomi. The books have the same titles as the episodes they are based on.

TV series
In 2010, The Octonauts was adapted into a 52-episode CGI animated television series co-produced by Chorion and Brown Bag Films. It first aired in the UK on 4 October 2010 on CBeebies, a BBC television channel for children under 7. The first series ended in February 2011 but continued to be aired as repeats. A second series of 22 episodes commenced in November 2012.

The Octonauts had its US premiere on the Disney Channel on 9 January 2012 In September 2014, Silvergate Media announced its sale of season 4 to the Disney Channel, to be aired in 2015. Many of the characters' voices were redubbed to give them American accents—Hispanic in the case of Peso and Pinto—although Captain Barnacles, Kwazii and Professor Inkling retained their original British voices. Another notable difference between the British version and the US version is the absence of the "Creature Report" feature at the end of each episode. This educational and melodic recap of the adventure is missing from the UK version, but is available to view in Britain through Netflix, which streams the American version.

In Australia, in 2014, the Octonauts became the second most-watched children's TV show in the country, seen daily on ABC2 by 257,000 viewers nationally. By season 4, the Octonauts had been picked up in more than 100 countries, including RTÉ Two (Ireland), Treehouse TV (Canada), ABC Television (Australia), TF1 (France), SuperRTL (Germany), CCTV (China), Karusel (Russia), Disney Junior (Spain, Portugal), and SVT (Sweden).

The show has been translated and shown in French (TF1), Spanish and Portuguese (Discovery Kids Latin America), Finnish (YLE TV2), Welsh (S4C), and Slovakian (STV 2).

The series was made with the help of marine biologists Dr. Lara A. Ferry-Graham and Dr. Michael H. Graham, who had previously worked on Finding Nemo.

Episodes

The TV show is episodic, with each 11-minute episode seeing them encountering an unusual but real sea creature as they explore strange underwater worlds. Often they must discover a vital biological or behavioral fact about that creature to rescue it or themselves from danger. The stories usually feature three main characters: Captain Barnacles, Kwazii, and Peso, with the other five Octonauts acting in supporting roles.

The opening theme tune finishes with the chant "Explore! – Rescue! – Protect!", the Octonauts’ motto.

Creature Reports
Creature Reports are one-minute, musical, poem-like sequences that recap the facts learned about the sea creature that the Octonauts encountered in the associated episode. In the UK, these were shown as separately scheduled items, but in the American version, they were used after each regular episode. The exception is the episode of "The Surfing Snails", where it was replaced with a surf rock song called, "Surf's Up, Bubbles Up (Ready to Ride)".

The Creature Report's addictive, repetitive nature has been postulated to have psychological benefits. For children, it provides a sense of predictability that promotes good feelings and mental balance. For adults, it provides a sense of virtual participation via the principle of involuntary musical imagery.

The initial working title of the 2017 American Superhero film "Thor: Ragnarok" was "Creature Report", a reference to the Octonauts, which acted as the movie production's code word.

Video services
Seasons of The Octonauts are available on variety of streaming and direct purchase video services.

Streaming services

Direct purchase services

Google Play and Microsoft Store organise their episodes into packages, similar to the region 4 DVD titles.

Home releases

Reception
The TV series was well received when shown on CBeebies in the UK and by ABC in Australia. According to the authors' website, it was the No. 1 pre-school age show in the UK, and the first pre-school show to be ranked in the top ten by older audiences (aged 3–4 and up). The show was the top-ranked ABC programme for 5- to 12-year-olds in January 2011 in Australia, with the ABC calling its first month an "unprecedented success online and on-air". The Octonauts DVD boxed set was 4th best-selling Children's TV DVD at Amazon UK as of 7 April 2013.

Awards and nominations
In 2013, Octonauts was nominated for two awards: an International Emmy Award in the "Kids—Preschool" category
and an Irish Film and Television Award in the "Best Children's/Youth Programme" category.

In 2017, the series took home the Annie Award for Best Animated Television Production in the Preschool category for the episode "Operation: Deep Freeze".

Films
In 2020, two new movies were released on Netflix: on August 14, The Octonauts Movie: The Caves of Sac Actun (which takes place in a cenote in Mexico) and on October 13, The Octonauts & the Great Barrier Reef (a musical). In 2021, The Octonauts Movie: The Ring of Fire was released March 30 on Netflix in the United States.

Spin-offs

The Octonauts brand has been licensed by the production company for numerous spin-off activities. These include Octonauts Rollercoaster Adventure, a themed rollercoaster within the CBeebies Land of Alton Towers theme park and themed bedrooms with the CBeebies Land Hotel. There is also a travelling live show called Octonauts Live, which has toured in the U.S. and other countries.

An Octonauts app was launched for iOS on 17 November 2016, produced in partnership with Night and Day Studios.

A spin off series, titled Octonauts: Above and Beyond, premiered on September 7, 2021, with the full first episode being released on YouTube on August 25. Rather than an aquatic setting, Above and Beyond features the crew exploring and assisting in natural habitats such as forests and deserts; essentially all terrestrial habitats.

References

External links

Channels
 Octonauts on Disney Junior US
 Octonauts on ABC 4 Kids
 Octonauts on Discovery Kids
 Octonauts on Discovery Kids Brazil
 Octonauts on TF1
 Octonauts on TFOU
 Octonauts on Treehouse

Other links
  (by the book's authors: Meomi Design)
 Official Octonauts store UK 
 Chorion's Octonauts TV site
 Octonauts on Disney Junior

2010s British animated television series
2010s British children's television series
2010 British television series debuts
2010s preschool education television series
Animated preschool education television series
British children's animated action television series
British children's animated adventure television series
British computer-animated television series
British preschool education television series
Irish preschool education television series
English-language television shows
BBC children's television shows
Nature educational television series
Episode list using the default LineColor
Series of children's books
British television shows based on children's books
Television series by Brown Bag Films
Animated television series about bears
Animated television series about cats
Animated television series about penguins
Television series by Sony Pictures Television
CBeebies